Fashion Forward is an Israeli style magazine published in Tel Aviv by Ofer Yeger and Shelly Peleg.

History
The first issue of Fashion Forward was published in 2009 in an on-line folding technique. In March 2011, it was acquired in a 700k NIS deal by mako.co.il web portal. The portal forwarded the initial domain name, and included the Fashion Forward section to match the style and design platform of Israeli television broadcaster Keshet.

In September 2011, Fashion Forward published an exposé on Vogue's Fashion's Night out in London, including interviews with Alexandra Shulman and Samantha Cameron. A following piece covered London Fashion Week.

See also
Israeli fashion
List of fashion magazines

References

External links
Fashion Forward' (HEB)
Fashion Forward @ KeshetMediaGroup.com (EN)
First issues of Fashion Forward

2009 establishments in Israel
Magazines published in Israel
Magazines established in 2009
Mass media in Tel Aviv
Women's magazines
Women's fashion magazines
History of women in Israel